Zhang Xi  (born 19 April 1985 in Jiangsu) is a Chinese female beach volleyball player, measuring  in height.  She won the gold medal in the women's team competition at the 2006 Asian Games in Doha, partnering with comparator  Xue Chen.

Zhang Xi in 2002 and 2003 she played each game she was scheduled to play. In 2004, she moved on to start playing full-time in the Swatch FIVB World Tour. In 2006, she began to partner Xue Chen in the SWATCH tournament season. After finishing the tournament she went back to study at the Physical Education Unit of Jiangsu Province in China.

In 2008 Zhang was named as the FIVB Most Outstanding player. In the same year, Zhang and Xue won the bronze medal at the 2008 Summer Olympics.

The duo of Zhang and Xue won a gold medal from the FIVB World Tour Women's Final in Åland, Finland on 21 August 2010. On the same day Zhang Xi and Xue Chen broke the winning streak of Brazil's França–Silva duo. In 2010 Zheng and Xue came fourth on the FIVB Beach Volleyball World Rankings.  In 2011 Zhang was awarded the title of FIVB Best Defensive Player. Together with her partner Xue Chen, Zhang Xi in 2012 reached fourth place at the London Olympics.

Playing partners
 Xue Chen
 Hu Xiaoyan
 Ji Linjun
 Tian Jia
 Pan Wang

See also
 China at the 2012 Summer Olympics#Volleyball
 Beach volleyball at the 2012 Summer Olympics – Women's tournament

References

External links
 

1985 births
Living people
Chinese female beach volleyball players
Olympic beach volleyball players of China
Olympic medalists in beach volleyball
Olympic bronze medalists for China
Asian Games medalists in beach volleyball
Asian Games gold medalists for China
Medalists at the 2006 Asian Games
Medalists at the 2010 Asian Games
Medalists at the 2008 Summer Olympics
Beach volleyball players at the 2006 Asian Games
Beach volleyball players at the 2008 Summer Olympics
Beach volleyball players at the 2010 Asian Games
Beach volleyball players at the 2012 Summer Olympics
Volleyball players from Jiangsu
Sportspeople from Nantong
Beach volleyball defenders